Ionna Stephanopoli (1875 - 1961) was a Greek journalist. In 1890, she and two others became the first women to be allowed to study at the University of Athens. After graduation, she continued her studies in Paris. She later became a reporter and editor.

References
 «Σήμερον Κηδεύεται η Ιωάννα Στεφανόπολι». Το Βήμα. 28 Μαρτίου 1961.

1875 births
1961 deaths
19th-century Greek writers
Greek women writers
19th-century women writers
19th-century journalists
Greek expatriates in France